Gulrukhsor Safieva (born 17 December 1947) is a prominent Iranologist, Persian literary figure and Tajik poet. In the late 1970s, Safieva was an editor-in-chief of the newspaper Pioneer of Tajikistan. She was known for her contribution to Iranistics, modern Persian poetry and Persian folk songs. She is highly regarded throughout Iranian cultural continent.

See also
Simin Behbahani

References

 Chopra, R.M., "Eminent Poetesses of Persian", 2010, Iran Society, Kolkata.

1947 births
Living people
Persian-language poets
Iranologists
Iranian women writers
Tajikistani women poets
20th-century Tajikistani poets
Tajik poets
Persian-language women poets
People from Dushanbe
20th-century poets
21st-century poets
20th-century Tajikistani writers
20th-century Tajikistani women writers
21st-century Tajikistani writers
21st-century Tajikistani women writers
21st-century Tajikistani poets